Hilde Sandvik (born 30 April 1970) is a Norwegian journalist.

She was born in Erfjord and has a cand.philol. degree from the University of Bergen, majoring in art history. She edited the periodical Syn og Segn from 2003 to 2006, was briefly debate editor in Dagbladet in 2005, and later journalist and debate editor in Bergens Tidende from 2006 to 2016. She has also released several books.

Sandvik became board member of the Association of Norwegian Editors in 2013 and Amedia in 2016.

References

1970 births
Living people
People from Suldal
Norwegian journalists
Norwegian women journalists
Norwegian magazine editors
University of Bergen alumni
Norwegian women editors
21st-century Norwegian writers
21st-century Norwegian women writers
Women magazine editors